Matthew White or Matt White is the name of:

Entertainment
 Matthew White (countertenor) (born 1973), Canadian opera singer
 Matt White (musician) (born 1980), American singer-songwriter
 Matthew E. White (born 1982), American singer-songwriter, producer, and founder of Spacebomb Records
 Matthew Putra Rama Whitbread (2009–2022), Indonesian actor

Sports
 Matthew White (basketball) (1957–2013), American basketball player
 Matthew White (cricketer) (born 1969), English cricketer
 Matt White (cyclist) (born 1974), Australian cyclist
 Matt White (baseball, born 1977), American left-handed baseball pitcher and rock entrepreneur
 Matt White (minor league pitcher) (born 1978), American right-handed baseball pitcher
 Matthew White (rugby league) (born 1984), Australian rugby league player
 Matthew White (footballer) (born 1987), Australian-rules footballer
 Matt White (ice hockey) (born 1989), American ice hockey player
 Matthew White (racing driver), motorsport racing driver

Other
 Matthew White (MP) (1766–1840), British Member of Parliament for Hythe, 1802–1806 and 1812–1818
 Matthew White (journalist) (born 1970), Australian sports presenter